Anne Wilson may refer to:
Anne Wilson (poet) (1848–1930), Australian poet
Anne Wilson (artist) (born 1949), American artist and educator
Anne Wilson (musician), American Christian musician
C. Anne Wilson, British food historian

See also
Ann Wilson (disambiguation)
Anna Wilson (disambiguation)